Schickendantziella is a plant genus in the Amaryllidaceae. It has only one species, Schickendantziella trichosepala, native to Argentina and Bolivia.

References

Allioideae
Flora of Argentina
Flora of Bolivia
Monotypic Amaryllidaceae genera
Taxa named by Carlo Luigi Spegazzini